Rangomarama is a genus of fungus gnats in the family Ditomyiidae.

Species
Rangomarama edwardsi Jaschhof & Didham, 2002
Rangomarama humboldti Jaschhof & Didham, 2002
Rangomarama leopoldinae Jaschhof & Didham, 2002
Rangomarama matilei Jaschhof & Didham, 2002
Rangomarama tonnoiri Jaschhof & Didham, 2002

References

Rangomaramidae
Sciaroidea genera